David Alejandro Henríquez Mandiola (born 21 February 1998) is a Chilean professional footballer who plays as a forward for Chilean club Deportes Concepción .

Honours

Club
Universidad Católica
 Primera División de Chile (2): 2018, 2019
 Supercopa de Chile (1): 2019

References

External links
 

1998 births
Living people
People from Antofagasta
Chilean footballers
Club Deportivo Universidad Católica footballers
A.C. Barnechea footballers
Deportes Santa Cruz footballers
Deportes Concepción (Chile) footballers
Chilean Primera División players
Primera B de Chile players
Segunda División Profesional de Chile players
Association football forwards